Al Quoz Sprint is a thoroughbred horse race held in Meydan Racecourse, Dubai, United Arab Emirates. It was first run in 2007 as part of the then, Dubai International Racing Carnival and subsequently moved to Dubai World Cup night in 2010 to coincide with the opening of Meydan Racecourse . In 2009, it became a Group 3 and is now run at Group 1 level.

Initially run over 1200m, in 2011, the race was shortened to a 1000-metre (5 furlongs) sprint. In 2017 the race reverted to 1200 metres (6 furlongs).

Records
Speed record:  (at distance of 1,000 metres)
 56.21 – Amber Sky (2014)

Most wins by a horse (2): 
 J J the Jet Plane (2009, 2011)

Most wins by a jockey(1):
 No jockey has won the race more than once

Most wins by a trainer(2):
 Mike De Kock (2009, 2013)
 Charlie Appleby (2018, 2019)

Most wins by an owner (2):
 H Du Preez, C Strydom, L Houdalakis, C Boyens (2009, 2011)
 Godolphin (2018, 2019)

Winners

See also
 List of United Arab Emirates horse races

References
Racing Post:

External links 
Dubai World Cup

Open sprint category horse races
Horse races in the United Arab Emirates
Recurring events established in 2007
Nad Al Sheba Racecourse
2007 establishments in the United Arab Emirates